Dwight Lodeweges (born 26 October 1957) is a Canadian–born Dutch football coach and former professional player. He is currently one of the assistant managers of the Netherlands national team. In 2020 - after Ronald Koeman left to join FC Barcelona - he was caretaker manager for 2 matches. On 29 June 2021 Frank de Boer resigned as coach and Lodeweges again took over on an interim basis until a new head coach was appointed.

Managerial career 
After the resignation of Huub Stevens, Lodeweges was named PSV Eindhoven's head coach. He finished the season, but then left to become head coach for NEC Nijmegen, On 9 April 2009, he signed on for two years but was dismissed from the role of manager at NEC Nijmegen after the defeat 4–0 of Sunday, against PSV Eindhoven.

On 9 March 2010, he was named as the new head coach of FC Edmonton. He left the club before its first competitive match and signed to coach JEF United Chiba of J2 League on 3 December 2010.

In 2013, he signed with SC Cambuur in the Dutch premier division. He left mid-season in 2014 when it became known he had signed with their arch-rivals SC Heerenveen for the next season. With Heerenveen he became seventh in the 2014–15 season. The start of the 2015–16 season was bad, with Heerenveen at the bottom of the table. In October 2015 he was replaced.

Managerial statistics

References

External links 
 NASL Statistics

1957 births
Living people
Canadian soccer players
Canadian expatriate soccer players
Canadian expatriate sportspeople in the Netherlands
Canadian expatriate sportspeople in Japan
Canadian expatriate sportspeople in the United Arab Emirates
Dutch expatriate footballers
Dutch expatriate sportspeople in Canada
Dutch expatriate sportspeople in Japan
Dutch expatriate sportspeople in the United Arab Emirates
Dutch footballers
Dutch people of Canadian descent
Edmonton Drillers (1979–1982) players
Eredivisie managers
Eredivisie players
Expatriate soccer players in Canada
Expatriate soccer players in the United States
PEC Zwolle managers
FC Groningen managers
SC Cambuur managers
SC Heerenveen managers
Netherlands national football team managers
Major Indoor Soccer League (1978–1992) players
Minnesota Strikers (MISL) players
Montreal Manic players
North American Soccer League (1968–1984) indoor players
North American Soccer League (1968–1984) players
NEC Nijmegen managers
J2 League managers
JEF United Chiba managers
People from Foothills County
Netherlands under-21 international footballers
Association football defenders
Dutch football managers
Canadian soccer coaches
SC Heerenveen non-playing staff
PEC Zwolle non-playing staff
Canadian expatriate soccer coaches
Dutch expatriate football managers